Bodenstown Graveyard is a cemetery located in County Kildare, Republic of Ireland. Containing a ruined medieval church, it is best known as the burial place of the Irish patriot Wolfe Tone (1763–1798).

History

It was described as being in good condition in 1612 but was ruined by the 19th century; all that remains are the west gable and north and south walls.

Tone was buried next to his father at Bodenstown following his death in 1798. Semi-official commemorations are believed to have begun in the 1840s. In "Tone's Grave", Thomas Davis describes his visit there .

Pilgrimages to Wolfe Tone's graveside were first held in 1873, the 75th anniversary of his death. After gaps in the 1880s, they resumed in 1891, and have been held every year since, except in 1906–10 and 1921. The ceremony, involving a march from Sallins railway station to the graveyard, took place on the Sunday closest to Tone's birthday, 20 June. Since 1922 there have been rival parades on different June Sundays due to schisms within Irish republicanism. The tomb was restored in 1971.

There is one British Commonwealth war grave of the First World War, of Private Walter Duffy of the Leinster Regiment, who died on 7 July 1918.

Notable burials

Theobald Wolfe Tone (1763–1798)
Private W. J. Duffy of the Prince of Wales's Leinster Regiment, died 7 July 1918

References

Cemeteries in County Kildare
Religion in County Kildare